Ludomy  is a village in the administrative district of Gmina Ryczywół, within Oborniki County, Greater Poland Voivodeship, in west-central Poland.

The village has a population of 500.

Notable residents 
 Kuno von Westarp (1864 – 1945), German politician

References

Ludomy